"Nu tar vi dom" (alternate spelling: Nu tar vi dem), also known as "VM, nu är det hockeyfeber", is a song used as a fight song for the Swedish national team during the 1989 IIHF World Ice Hockey Championship in Sweden. Lasse Holm wrote both lyrics and music, and the song was recorded by the players themselves, with Håkan Södergren as lead singer. The single peaked at second position on the Swedish singles chart. The B-side was "Här kommer grabbarna" by Lotta Engberg. The song became a Svensktoppen hit for seven weeks between 9 April-21 May 1989, and topped the chart between 16-30 April that year.

The song was originally written on demand following a meeting with insurance company Trygg Hansa and the Swedish Ice Hockey Association. The "Hockey!" chant during the beginning of the recording was performed by pupils from Lasse Holm's son's school class.

The song also appeared on the Hockey'n'Roll compilation album.

Charts

References

1989 songs
1989 singles
1988–89 in Swedish ice hockey
Swedish songs
Swedish-language songs
Sporting songs
IIHF Men's World Ice Hockey Championships
Sweden men's national ice hockey team
Songs written by Lasse Holm